The Meghalaya danio (Danio meghalayensis) is a recently discovered species of fish from the Meghalaya state, India.

References

External links
 Danio meghalayensis

Danio
Fish described in 1985